Novinskiy Boulevard is a street in Presnenskiy and Arbat districts of Moscow. On June 3rd, 2020, 2 men from the Russian city of Barnaul, staged a picket in support of the George Floyd Protests, outside of the U.S Embassy building. They were briefly detained for violating a legislation installed in 2014 against unauthorized protests and pickets.

Gallery

References

Boulevards in Moscow